Kunwar Kashmira Singh (1821 - 7 May 1844), sometimes styled as Shahzada was the 
son of Maharaja Ranjit Singh of the Sikh Empire and Rani Daya Kaur. 

Kashmira Singh was procured by Rani Daya Kaur, he was said to be the son of a servant in her household by a Jammu Rajput. He was presented to, and accepted by Ranjit Singh as her son along with Kunwar Pashaura Singh.

Kashmir Singh had one son, Sardar Fateh Singh. He was granted a half-share of a large jagir in Baraich, Oudh, after the annexation. He married Rani Lakshman Kaur, daughter of Subadar Jawahir Singh and had one son Fateh Singh.

He was killed in battle against the Sandhawalias, 7 May 1844.

Note

Sikh Empire
1821 births
1844 deaths
Punjabi people